The 1987 Asian Men's Handball Championship was the fourth Asian Championship, which was taking place from 20 to 29 August 1987 in Amman, Jordan. The competition is played along with first Women's Championship.

Preliminary round

Group A

Group B

Group C

Elimination round

Final round

Placement 10th–11th

Placement 7th–9th

Placement 4th–6th

Championship

Final standing

References

External links
Results

Hand
Asian Handball Championships
A
H
August 1987 sports events in Asia
September 1987 sports events in Asia
Sports competitions in Amman